Robert Palm  is an American writer and producer for television, best known as the first executive producer of the currently running NBC drama, Law & Order: Special Victims Unit and a consulting producer on the currently running CBS drama, NCIS.

His work with Law & Order was nominated for an Emmy Award in 1992.

References

External links 

Year of birth missing (living people)
Living people
Place of birth missing (living people)
American television producers